Ahmed Khan of Nakhichevan ( Pers. احمدخان نخجوان ) was an Iranian military leader, major general and Defense Minister (September 13, 1893  - April 28, 1966)

Biography
Ahmed Khan was born in 1893 into an Azerbaijani family in the city of Tabriz and was the eldest son of Ali Khan of Nakhichevan. He belonged to the famous and influential Kangarli clan of Nakhichevan , which gave Azerbaijan many outstanding personalities from politicians, historians, scientists.

Nakhichevan studied in France. After leaving school, he held various insignificant posts in Tehran. All this time he remained a close friend of Mohammed Reza Pahlavi. He was the prince's assistant. Close friendly relations were established between the prince and Ahmed Khan.

The new Shah Mohammed Reza was declared heir on January 1, 1926 . He was educated in Switzerland, graduated from the officer's school in Tehran. In 1938 , returning from Europe, he visited Baku. During the reign of Reza, he often took part in government meetings and actually served as the minister of war. General Ahmed Khan of Nakhichevan, who held the post of Minister of War at that time, was actually his assistant.

Colonel Ahmad Nakhjavan completed his pilot training in 1925, and in February of the same year, he flew to Iran with a plane purchased from France, and landed in Qala-e-Marghi on the 5th of March. Ahmad Nakhjavan became the first head of the Imperial Iranian Air Force and was the director of aviation with him until 1937. During this time he was changed several times and fired, but each time he returned to service after a short time. In 1929 he became a brigadier general. In 1940, he became the acting Minister of War in Ahmad Matin's cabinet, and in 1319, he was promoted to the rank of Major General. Nakhchivan was under the auspices of the Ministry of War until September 29, 1941, at the same time as the Soviet and British forces invaded Iran, and approved the plan to dismiss conscripts and recruit contract soldiers to members of the Supreme Army Council. This caused severe change and protests from Reza Shah; Therefore, Ahmad severely beat Nakhjavan and threw him in prison. He was imprisoned until September 16 and became Minister of War on September 20, after the Shah resigned to restore Foroughi's cabinet. After that, he was an inspector and head of Mohammad Reza Shah's military office for some time and died in 1967.

Ahmad Nakhjavan was the first Iranian pilot to fly a Breguet-19 aircraft with the Iranian flag and emblem from France to Tehran's Qala-e-Marghi base on February 25, 1925. Nakhchivan had trained in France and flew only 200 hours. Thus, on this date, the first aircraft of the Iranian Air Force, piloted by an Iranian, crossed the international borders and reached the Iranian airspace. During this period, the Iranian Air Force was removed from the form of a small office at the Army Command Headquarters and became a separate force called the Imperial Army Air Force of Iran.

Ahmad Nakhjavan, along with Ismail Meraat, the then Minister of Culture, emphasized Persian orthography, and their efforts and those of others accompanied the Shah in ordering the establishment of a Persian language.

References

Bibliography

Imperial Iranian Army major generals
1893 births
1967 deaths
Iranian people of World War II
Commanders of Imperial Iranian Air Force